Sai Shravanam is an Indian music producer, recording and scoring engineer.He is a self trained tabla player   and one of the few classically trained sound engineers in the country. He is the owner and founder of ResoundIndia in the city of Chennai.

Early career

As a child music prodigy and ardent devotee of Sathya Sai Baba, Sai Shravanam showed signs of great talent from the tender age of six. While he was watching a TV commercial for tea featuring tabla wizard of Ustad Zakir Hussain creating magical notes,Sai Shravanam imprinted those notes in his mind. The impact of it was so profound that his parents got him his first tabla set. Four years later, he was spotted by maestro Zakir Hussain. Early percussion lessons from Hussain and his brother Fazal Quereshi burnished his talent and got him the opportunity to work in various cross cultural and experimental music endeavors 
with composers/artistes.

He is considered by the Times of India as a rare engineer who has dedicated his career concentrating on recording, archiving and producing classical Indian music.Since 2004, Sai has been an active musician, sound engineer and a music producer for various film projects, classical music albums, documentary films, dance theatre productions etc. In the Indian film industry, Sai has performed exclusively for the legendary music composer A.R. Rahman, both in his soundtracks as well as live performances.

Main works

 His first commercial album "Confluence of Elements", as a musician/music director and music producer, was released in the year 2007. Sung by Bombay Jayashri, today this album is regarded as one of the most uniquely executed music album in the country.
 In the year 2012, his versatility fetched him commendable recognition as a Sound Recordist/Additional Engineer for the Academy award winning film Life of Pi by 20th Century Fox, directed by Ang Lee.
 In the year 2015 in The Man Who Knew Infinity directed by Mathew Brown, Sai Shravanam was credited uniquely as Indian Music Producer, arranger, Musician and Sound Recordist.
 Music production and sound design for the dance theatre production , Thari- the Loom, is the work of Sai Shravanam. The 75-minute programme explores the design and play of thread in the Bharatanatyam language of dance. Sai Shravanam recorded the sound of the silk and cotton looms in Kanchipuram India, the most famous temple town. Using these sounds and the rhythm of the weaver, he composed an exclusive soundtrack with the loom sounds specifically to the sound of Classical Indian Dance, Bharatanatyam.

Awards

 1996 – Ugadi Puraskar Awards- Child prodigy For Tabla
 2017 – Sangeet Natak Akademi Award Yuva Puraskar – Music for Dance
2021- Kalaimamani award by TamilNadu Government.

Discography

 Tamasha, the soundtrack album, composed by A. R. Rahman
 As sound analyst in Chains: Love Stories of Shadows the soundtrack album, composed by A. R. Rahman.
 Lingaa (soundtrack)
 Confluence of elements album composed and produced by Sai Shravanam sung by Bombay Jayashri
 Kaaviya Thalaivan (soundtrack)
 As Sound Analyst in Yudh: Three perspectives, one truth.
 Sai has worked on the movie Kabali, music by Santhosh Narayanan
 Mixed and Mastered Music of Server Sundaram, music by Santhosh Narayanan
 Worked in Mersal,music by A. R. Rahman
 Worked in Kaala, music by Santhosh Narayanan
 Worked in Bigil,music by A. R. Rahman
 Mixed and mastered the single Enjoy Enjaami by Dhee, featuring Arivu and produced by Santhosh Narayanan

References

Indian sound designers
Indian record producers
Musicians from Chennai
1981 births
Living people
21st-century Indian musicians